Altrix is a genus of sea snails, marine gastropod mollusks in the family Fissurellidae, the keyhole limpets.

Species
Species within the genus Aktrix include:
 Altrix trifolium (Dall, 1881)
 Altrix altior (Meyer & Aldrich, 1886) 
 Altrix leesi (Sohl, 1992) 
 Altrix pacifica (Squires & Goedert, 1996) 
 Altrix palmerae (Olsson, 1964)

References

 Nomenclator Zoologicus info

Fissurellidae